The 1934 Wyoming gubernatorial election took place on November 6, 1934. Incumbent Democratic Governor Leslie A. Miller ran for re-election to his second term, and his first full term, following his initial election in the 1932 special election. Miller faced Republican Alonzo M. Clark, his predecessor as governor, in the general election. Despite the closeness of Miller's first election, he took advantage of the nationwide Democratic landslide and easily defeated Clark.

Democratic primary

Candidates
 Leslie A. Miller, incumbent Governor
 Tom D. O'Neil, former state highway commissioner

Results

Republican Primary

Candidates
 Alonzo M. Clark, former Governor of Wyoming
 Nels H. Smith, former state highway commissioner, former State Representative
 John A. Whiting, Wyoming State Engineer
 Frank E. Lucas, former Governor of Wyoming

Results

Results

References

1934 Wyoming elections
1934
Wyoming
November 1934 events